Events from the year 1844 in Sweden

Incumbents
 Monarch – Charles XIV John then Oscar I

Events
 - King Charles XIV John of Sweden dies and is succeeded by Oscar I of Sweden. 
 22 October - Swedish History Museum
 - Du gamla, Du fria  by Richard Dybeck

Births
 23 February – Per Ekström, landscape painter   (died 1935) 
 21 December – Olga Sandberg, ballerina (died 1926)
 9 September – Ebba Boström, nurse and a philanthropist (died 1902)
 9 November – Wilhelm von Gegerfelt, painter (dies 1920)
 1 October – Wilhelmina von Hallwyl, collector and donor (died 1930)

Deaths

 2 May - Karl Fredrik Dahlgren, poet (born 1791)
 16 September – Magnus Brahe (1790–1844), soldier (born 1790)

References

 
Years of the 19th century in Sweden
Sweden